Chocñacota (possibly from Aymara ch'uxña green, quta lake "green lake") is a mountain in the Apolobamba mountain range in Peru and the name of a lake near the mountain. The mountain and the lake are situated in the Puno Region, Putina Province, Ananea District, near the Bolivian border. They lie southwest and northwest of the mountains Ichocollo and Palomani.

Chocñacota is also the name of an intermittent stream which originates near the lake. It flows to the west.

See also 
 Chapi
 Ritipata
 Riti Urmasca
 Salluyu

References

Mountains of Peru
Mountains of Puno Region
Lakes of Peru
Lakes of Puno Region